Emily Hegarty (born 3 August 1998) is an Irish rower. She competed in the women's coxless four event at the 2020 Summer Olympics and won a bronze medal. At the same Olympics, her third cousin Paul O'Donovan also won a gold medal for rowing in the lightweight double sculls. Along with her team-mates, she was named as the Irish Times/Sport Ireland Sportswoman for July 2021.

References

External links
 
 Emily Hegarty at Rowing Ireland
 

1998 births
Living people
Irish female rowers
People from Skibbereen
Olympic rowers of Ireland
Rowers at the 2020 Summer Olympics
Medalists at the 2020 Summer Olympics
Olympic medalists in rowing
Olympic bronze medalists for Ireland